William McLoughlin was a professional footballer who played as a wing half. He played six games in the Football League for Burnley.

References

Year of birth unknown
Association football wing halves
Burnley F.C. players
English Football League players
Year of death missing
English footballers